Gora Dyultydag, or simply Dyultydag, is a mountain located in Dagestan, Russia. At  elevation, it is the highest point of the Dyultydag range of the Greater Caucasus.

Toponymy 
Dyultydag refers to both a mountain range and its higher summit, Gora Dyultydag.

Sometimes the Cyrillic name Дюльтыдаг is transliterated as Dyul'tydag.

Geography 
The mountain belongs to the Samur basin. The closest village to Dyultydag is Archib in Charodinsky District. In 1961 its summit was reported as perennial snow-capped. At an elevation of 4127 m Gora Dyultydag is Dagestan's fifth-highest mountain and the 45th-highest in Russia.

See also

 List of European ultra prominent peaks

References

External links 
 

Mountains of Dagestan
Four-thousanders of the Caucasus